Marius Rossillon (June 8, 1867 – January 2, 1946), known professionally as O'Galop, was a French artist and cartoonist. He is best known for creating Bibendum, or the Michelin Man, the official mascot of the Michelin tyre company.

Life 
O'Galop was born in Lyon, France in 1867.

He began his career around 1893, drawing cartoons for magazines. He created his first advertisement for Michelin in 1898 and would continue creating posters for the company featuring Bibendum until 1911. He was also a pioneer in animation and created about 40 animated films between 1910 and 1927.

O'Galop died in Carsac-Aillac, France in 1946.

References

External links

Public Health Designed by O'Galop (1918) at Europa Film Treasures
You Have to Say It (1918) at Europa Film Treasures

1867 births
1946 deaths
Michelin people
French animators
French cartoonists
French comics artists
French animated film directors